Brays Fernández Vidal (born 30 September 1988), best known by the stage name Brays Efe, is a Spanish actor and television personality. He became popular for his role in the comedy web series Paquita Salas.

Biography
Brays Fernández Vidal was born in Las Palmas de Gran Canaria on 30 September 1988. He grew up however in a farm in Nigrán, province of Pontevedra, Galicia. He moved to Madrid to study Audiovisual Communication, but he dropped out. He has worked as a journalist, casting assistant and radio announcer. He performed the role of El mayordomo in the four initial episodes of the talk show El Tea Party de Alaska y Mario. He took part in the 7th season of the celebrity reality contest of Tu cara me suena, impersonating María del Monte, Netta, Sara Montiel, Eminem, Julio Iglesias, Chayanne and Miki Núñez. In 2021, Amazon Prime Video selected him to co-host  together with Paula Vázquez.

Filmography

Film

Television
Fiction

Nonfiction

Awards and nominations

References

External links

1988 births
Living people
Complutense University of Madrid alumni
People from Las Palmas
People from Nigrán
Spanish male film actors
Spanish male television actors
21st-century Spanish male actors